The Firm of Girdlestone is a 1915 British silent drama film directed by Harold M. Shaw and starring Edna Flugrath, Fred Groves and Charles Rock. It is an adaptation of the 1890 novel The Firm of Girdlestone by Arthur Conan Doyle. It was shot at Twickenham Studios.

Cast
 Edna Flugrath as Kate Horston
 Fred Groves as Ezra Girdlestone
 Charles Rock as John Girdlestone
 Wyndham Guise as Major Clutterbuck
 Hayford Hobbs as Tom Dimsdale
 Gwynne Herbert as Mrs. Scully
 Mollie Terraine as Rebecca

References

Bibliography
 Nollen, Scott Allen. Sir Arthur Conan Doyle at the Cinema. McFarland & Co., 1996.

External links

1915 films
1915 drama films
Films directed by Harold M. Shaw
Films based on British novels
British silent feature films
British drama films
Vitagraph Studios films
Films shot at Twickenham Film Studios
British black-and-white films
1910s English-language films
1910s American films
1910s British films